Daniel K. Lyons (born March 8, 1958 in Upper Darby, Pennsylvania) is an American rower who competed in the 1988 Summer Olympics in the coxed pair.

Lyons has rowed on seven US National Teams, resulting in two world bronze medals, a world gold medal, and a gold medal at the Pan American Games. After winning 11 national rowing championships, he was inducted into the US Rowing Hall of Fame.

At the 1988 Olympic Games, his partner Robert Espeseth became sick and he finished in 11th place with a replacement partner. Lyons has also coached rowing since 1983 at the US Naval Academy, St. Joseph's Prep in Philadelphia, Oxford University, Stanford University, Drexel University, Georgetown University, and Penn Athletic Club in Philadelphia.

In 1981, Lyons graduated from the United States Naval Academy. In 1987, he obtained a degree in politics, philosophy and economics from Oxford University. In 1989, he was granted his master's degree in American history by Villanova University. He later also pursued a Ph.D. in military history from Temple University. He has also taught history at the US Naval Academy and Rutgers University.

Lyons is now the president of leadership consultants Team Concepts, which counts Alcoa and Johnson & Johnson among its clients and 12 former Olympians on its staff.

References

External links 
 
 

1958 births
Living people
People from Upper Darby Township, Pennsylvania
Olympic rowers of the United States
Rowers at the 1988 Summer Olympics
United States Naval Academy alumni
Alumni of the University of Oxford
Villanova University alumni
United States Naval Academy faculty
Rutgers University faculty
World Rowing Championships medalists for the United States
American male rowers
Pan American Games medalists in rowing
Pan American Games gold medalists for the United States
Rowers at the 1983 Pan American Games
Medalists at the 1983 Pan American Games
Military personnel from Pennsylvania